The 2008 Rally Argentina, officially 28º Rally Argentina, is the fourth round of 2008 World Rally Championship season; it is a second gravel round of the championship and also the second round of the Production World Rally Championship. The event began with a ceremonial start on Thursday, March 27 in Córdoba and ended after a Super Special Stage and ten minutes service "E" in Villa Carlos Paz.

Some stages of the rally, especially the ones from final day, similarly to those seen on the Mexican event, are held in the mountainous area of the country, thus drivers climb up to 2100 meters above sea levels. The event, however, is more varied and some competitive kilometers lead through vast Argentinian plains.

Summary

The rally began in rainy and muddy conditions. Mikko Hirvonen was the first on the road as the championship leader and managed to open up a 48-second gap to Jari-Matti Latvala and a 50-second gap to Sébastien Loeb. However, the BP Ford drivers soon dropped out of contention. On the second stage, Latvala spun off and lost about nine minutes, and on the fifth stage, Hirvonen and Stobart VK M-Sport Ford's Henning Solberg damaged their cars while hitting rocks and retired from the rally. Loeb managed to open up a comfortable gap to Subaru's Chris Atkinson and Petter Solberg. Other drivers in the points after day one were Gigi Galli, Dani Sordo, Federico Villagra, Matthew Wilson and Latvala.

Loeb continued to lead throughout day two, and Solberg passed his teammate Atkinson for second place. Galli retired from fourth place to preserve his vehicle when smoke started to pour from his Ford Focus after SS13. Latvala also had problems with his Focus and retired. After day two, due to the high level of attrition, Sordo was now in fourth place, Conrad Rautenbach had climbed to fifth, Hirvonen, who re-joined the event under SupeRally rules, to sixth and Andreas Aigner to seventh. Villagra was in eighth place.

French World Rally Champion held his lead until the very end of the event and won the event with over two and a half minute advantage over the Subaru driver, Atkinson. The young Australian's steady pace paid off and he was able to claim second place after electric in Petter Solberg's car malfunctioned and he had to retire. Petter's brother, Henning, didn't manage to finish either - shock absorber in older Solberg's Focus was blown through the hood again, same way as on Friday, and he ended his rally at the very same spot as his younger sibling.

The last man on the podium was second Citroën driver, Dani Sordo, followed by Conrad Rautenbach in another C4 WRC, who was therefore first Zimbabwean to ever score points in an WRC event. Fifth was Ford's Mikko Hirvonen who managed to score four points in drivers' and five in manufacturers' championship despite massive penalties for using SupeRally. Last three pointing drivers were Munchi's Federico Villagra, Stobart's Gigi Galli, who also restarted under SupeRally format and Andreas Aigner driving a group N Mitsubishi Lancer Evolution IX. He was also first in PWRC classification, followed by Argentinian Sebastián Beltrán and Finn Jari Ketomaa.

Results

Special stages 
All dates and times are ART (UTC-3).

Footnotes:A  all times local

Championship standings after the event

Drivers' championship

Manufacturers' championship

Production championship
Points table:

References

External links 

 Results at official page WRC.com
 Results on eWRC-results.com

Argentina
Rally Argentina
Rally